Joseph Odero-Jowi (August 15, 1936October 17, 2015) was a Kenyan diplomat. He represented Kenya in the United Nations for several years, working to bring the United Nations Environment Programme's headquarters to Nairobi.

Biography 
Jowi was born on August 15, 1936 in Sori, Kenya, and attended the village's primary school, the Kisii School and the Kagumo Teachers College. He also spent several years in India at the universities of Calcutta and New Delhi, studying economics.

He was principal of the African Labour College in Kampala, Uganda, from 1961 to 1963. In 1963 he married Salome and returned to Kenya. In 1966 Jowi was elected to represent the Ndhiwa Constituency in the Kenyan National Assembly. He worked in the Ministry of Labour, then the Ministry of Finance. In 1969 Jowi briefly served as minister for economic planning and development in Kenya's cabinet after Tom Mboya, who had held the role, was assassinated. He lost reelection later that year, and was appointed Kenya's ambassador to the United Nations. In that role, Jowi was a key figure in getting the United Nations Environment Programme's headquarters to be placed in Nairobi in the early 1970s. In 1974 he left the UN to be re-elected to the Kenyan Parliament, representing Ndhiwa. However, three years later Jowi resigned and returned to the United Nations.

In 2007 Jowi was awarded named an Elder of the Order of the Burning Spear. In 2014 he was described as living in a housing development in Langata, Kenya, with his wife. He died on October 17, 2015.

References 

1936 births
2015 deaths